Burton Wilkinson (25 April 1900 – 16 October 1985) was an American born English cricketer.  Wilkinson was a left-handed batsman who bowled slow left-arm orthodox.  He was born at Burton, Nebraska.

Wilkinson made a single first-class appearance for Northamptonshire against Middlesex at the Town Ground, Peterborough in the 1932 County Championship.  In Northamptonshire's first-innings he was dismissed for a duck by Jack Durston.  He Middlesex's first-innings he claimed his only wicket of the match, that of Nigel Haig.

He died at Peterborough, Cambridgeshire on 16 October 1985.

References

External links
Burton Wilkinson at ESPNcricinfo
Burton Wilkinson at CricketArchive

1900 births
1985 deaths
People from Keya Paha County, Nebraska
English people of American descent
English cricketers
Northamptonshire cricketers
Sportspeople from Nebraska